Thomas Cornthwaite (27 May 1892 – 1968) was an English footballer who played in the Football League for Bury. He also worked part-time as a policeman and in 1920 he missed several games for the Shakers due to a miners' strike because all police leave was cancelled.

References

1892 births
1968 deaths
English footballers
Association football goalkeepers
English Football League players
Bradford City A.F.C. players
Fleetwood Town F.C. players
Preston North End F.C. players
Bury F.C. players
Connah's Quay & Shotton F.C. players
Lytham F.C. players
Manchester North End F.C. players
British police officers